Brookfield Place is a skyscraper within the Brookfield Place office complex in Perth, Western Australia. It is currently the second tallest building in Western Australia. Located at 125 St Georges Terrace, the major tenant is BHP. 

Construction commenced in April 2008 and was completed in 2012. The project is estimated to have cost around A$500 million. Other tenants include PwC, Allianz, Barrick Gold, Navitas and Servcorp.

Developers Brookfield lodged a development application for the second stage of Brookfield Place in July 2011, for a  16-storey office tower to be situated to the south of the main tower fronting Mounts Bay Road. Tower 2 was completed in 2015, with major tenants including Multiplex, Westpac, Wesfarmers, Ashurst, Corrs Chambers Westgarth and Deloitte.

Retail tenants in the Brookfield Place complex include Montblanc and Daniel Hechter.

History

 1986 - Laurie Connell and Alan Bond both buy 25% stakes in the site in 1986 in partnership with the State Superannuation Board.
 1988 - The site, then called Perth Technical College, sold to Kerry Packer and Warren Anderson for $270 million. One office building on what was renamed "Westralia Square" was constructed. The development is mired in WA state politics, and the deal will later be scrutinised in detail by the WA Inc Royal Commission. Kerry Packer famously declares: "All West Australians are crooks."
 1990s - A $2 billion development by Indonesia's Samma Group collapses.
 2003 - Kerry Packer sells the site to Multiplex and Stowe for $19 million, taking a loss of $200 million. Multiplex and Griffin have agreed to carve up the Westralia Square property. Griffin has a smaller area on Mounts Bay Road and Multiplex has the prime location fronting St Georges Terrace.
 December 2007 - BHP signs the biggest office leasing deal in Perth's history—.
 March 2008 - Perth's Lord Mayor announces that BHP will be headquartering in Perth, and their Melbourne operations will be significantly downgraded. (This is confirmed in August 2014).

Design 
Brookfield Place Tower is the tallest side core commercial building in the southern hemisphere. Designed by Hassell and Fitzpatrick + Partners, it included the restoration of the surrounding  historic Newspaper House Group of Buildings, comprising four heritage-listed buildings, constructed between 1910 and 1932.

The offset core protects the enclosed space by buffering the façade against the adverse northern sun and the associated solar heat gain. Externally, the expressive structural east and west exoskeletons create the distinctive tower aesthetic. The vertical expression of the tower structure accentuates the height of the building, which terminates in a tapered structural roof crown.

Tower 2 was designed by Woods Bagot. The project also incorporates a sheltered upper-level walkway across Mounts Bay Road to provide greater connectivity between the Elizabeth Quay bus station, Elizabeth Quay railway station and Perth's CBD.

Gallery

See also
List of lanes and arcades in Perth, Western Australia
List of tallest buildings in Perth
List of tallest buildings in Australia
List of tallest buildings and structures in Australia
Old Perth Technical School
Print Hall

References

External links
  Brookfield Place official Website
 BHP Tower on Emporis, the skyscraper database
 TPG website
 Hassell website
 fitzpatrick+partners website

Skyscrapers in Perth, Western Australia
Office buildings in Perth, Western Australia
St Georges Terrace
Skyscraper office buildings in Australia
Retail buildings in Western Australia
Brookfield Properties buildings
Office buildings completed in 2012
Modernist architecture in Australia